Learned Pond was formed during the last glaciation. It is next to Brigham Road and Union Ave in Framingham, Massachusetts next to MetroWest Medical Center at an elevation of 165 ft. The pond has a beach and is surrounded in parts by woods.

References

External links
 Framingham, Massachusetts's Official Website
 A list of Massachusetts' Lakes and Ponds
 Learned Pond with Lesson

Framingham, Massachusetts
Lakes of Middlesex County, Massachusetts
Ponds of Massachusetts